Chowgan (also Romanized as Chowgān) is a village in Khenejin Rural District, in the Central District of Komijan County, Markazi Province, Iran. At the 2018 census, its population was 300/, in 50 families.

References 

Populated places in Komijan County